The 2016 Torneio Internacional de Manaus de Futebol Feminino (also known as the 2016 International Tournament of Manaus) is the eighth edition of the Torneio Internacional de Futebol Feminino, an invitational women's football tournament held every December in Brazil. Previously held in the cities of Brasília, São Paulo and Natal, 2016 is the first year the tournament will be held in Manaus. The tournament will run from December 7–18, 2016.

Format
In the first phase, the four teams play each other within the group in a single round. The two teams with the most points earned in the respective group, qualify for the next phase. In the final stage, the first and second teams placed in the Group contest the final. If the match ends in a tie, the team with the best record in the first phase is declared the winner. The third and fourth teams placed in the group contest the third place play-off. If the match ends in a tie, the team with the best record in the first phase is declared the winner.

Venues
All matches will take place at Arena da Amazônia in Manaus.

Squads

Group stage
All times are local (UTC−03:00)

Knockout stage

Third place match

Final

Final results

Goalscorers
5 goals
 Bia

4 goals
 Andressinha
 Debinha

3 goals
 Gabi Zanotti
 Gabbiadini

2 goals
 Ilaria Mauro
 Nadezhda Karpova

1 goals

 Tamires
 Melissa Herrera
 Barbara Bonansea
 Alice Parisi
 Martina Piemonte
 Sara Gama
 Valentina Bergamaschi
 Elena Morozova
 Ekaterina Pantyukhina

 1 own goal
  Bartoli (playing against Brazil)

References

External links
Official Official Tournament Page in Portuguese

2016 in women's association football
2016 in Brazilian women's football
2016